Lissa Mary Audrey Labiche (born February 18, 1993) is Seychellois athlete competing in the high jump and occasionally long jump.

Career
In the Women's high jump event at the 2012 Summer Olympics, she finished tied for 20th place and did not advance to the final.

She competed for the Seychelles at the 2016 Summer Olympics in Rio de Janeiro. She finished 29th in the qualifying round for women's high jump and did not advance to the finals. She was the flag bearer for the Seychelles during the closing ceremony.

Competition record

Personal bests
Outdoor
800 m – 2:47.15 (Gaborone 2011)
100 m hurdles – 15.59 (-0.8 m/s) (Gaborone 2011)
High jump – 1.92 m (Potchefstroom 2015) NR
Long jump – 6.28 m (-4.6 m/s) (Windhoek 2012)
Shot put – 9.85 m (Gaborone 2011)
Javelin throw – 24.49 m (Gaborone 2011)
Heptathlon – 4663 pts (Gaborone 2011)

Indoor
High jump – 1.89 m (Portland 2016)

References

External links
 

1993 births
Living people
Seychellois female high jumpers
Heptathletes
Olympic athletes of Seychelles
Athletes (track and field) at the 2012 Summer Olympics
Athletes (track and field) at the 2016 Summer Olympics
Commonwealth Games competitors for Seychelles
Athletes (track and field) at the 2010 Commonwealth Games
Athletes (track and field) at the 2014 Commonwealth Games
Athletes (track and field) at the 2015 African Games
World Athletics Championships athletes for Seychelles
African Games gold medalists for Seychelles
African Games medalists in athletics (track and field)
African Games bronze medalists for Seychelles
South Carolina Gamecocks women's track and field athletes